The Pilatus P-3 was a military training aircraft built by Pilatus Aircraft of Switzerland.

Design and development
The Pilatus P-3 was designed for primary and advanced training (including night flying, aerobatics and instrument flying). The military version was designated P-3-03. It was of all-metal construction with a retractable tricycle undercarriage and tandem seating.  There was provision for underwing racks for light practice bombs or rockets and a machine gun in a pod below the port wing.

Operational history
The first prototype was built in 1953 and flew on 3 September, the same year. The Swiss Air Force received 72 examples of this aircraft while the Brazilian Navy acquired six. The Swiss Air Force used the P-3 as a training aircraft until 1983, although it continued to be used as a liaison aircraft for another decade. In 1993–1995, 65 ex-Swiss Air Force aircraft were sold on the private market.

Operators

 Brazilian Navy

 Swiss Air Force
 P3 Flyers

The P-3 Flyers is an independent air display team based in Switzerland. Formed in 1996. it currently operates five ex-Swiss Air Force P3 aircraft.

Specifications (Pilatus P-3-03)

See also

References

Bibliography

External links

 

P-03
1950s Swiss military trainer aircraft
Single-engined tractor aircraft
Low-wing aircraft
Aircraft first flown in 1953